Chaurideurali is a Rural municipality located within the Kavrepalanchowk District of the Bagmati Province of Nepal.
The municipality spans  of area, with a total population of 20,829 according to a 2011 Nepal census.

On March 10, 2017, the Government of Nepal restructured the local level bodies into 753 new local level structures.
The previous Sanowangthali, Nagre Gagarche, Majhi Feda, Dhuseni Siwalaya, Gothpani Pokhari Chauri, Kartike Deurali, Madan Kundari, Birtadeurali and Gothpani VDCs were merged to form Chaurideurali Rural Municipality.
Chaurideurali is divided into 9 wards, with Kattike Deurali declared the administrative center of the rural municipality.

References

External links
official website of the rural municipality

Rural municipalities in Kavrepalanchowk District
Rural municipalities of Nepal established in 2017